Matiate is an archaeological site underneath the town of Midyat, in Mardin province, Turkey. It is assumed to have been in use for 1,900 years, at its peak to have been inhabited by up to 70,000 people and is considered to be the largest cave system in the world.

Discovery    
The tunnel system was discovered by chance in 2020 during renovation works in Midyat's old town. Construction workers unearthed a limestone cave which led to a tunnel and other caves. Subsequent large excavation works began and, by 2022, 49 rooms were made visible. The underground city was called Matiate which translates into "city of caves".

Extension 
The town's origins date back to the 2nd or 3rd century CE and at its peak it is believed to have been inhabited by between 60,000 and 70,000 people.  of tunnels and 49 rooms have been unearthed, but it is assumed that only 3% of the city has been discovered. Excavation works were performed in co-operation with the Ministry of Culture and Tourism, Midyat's municipality and the Museum of Mardin and, according to Gani Tarkan,, the head of the museum and the excavation works, excavations would extend to the whole district of Midyat.

Function 
Gani Tarkan, the director of excavations of Matiate, assumes that the cave system was used as a hiding place for persecuted people. During the Roman era, the Christian religion was persecuted and its adherents were known to have lived in similar underground cities throughout Anatolia. In the cave system there is a Christian church and a room with a Star of David, which is assumed to be a Jewish synagogue. Water wells, silos, coins, lamps and bones of humans and animals were also discovered. Researchers assume it was used as a hiding place between the 1st and 6th century. After the population returned to live above surface, it continued in use as a wine cellar and catacomb.

References 

Archaeological sites in Southeastern Anatolia
Underground cities
Former populated places in Turkey